The Frances Hodgkins Fellowship, established in 1962, is one of New Zealand's premier arts residencies. The list of past fellows includes many of New Zealand's most notable artists.

The position is based at the University of Otago in Dunedin, New Zealand, and is awarded annually. The fellowship was created  to encourage painters and sculptors in the practice and advancement of their art, to associate them with life in the University, and at the same time to foster an interest in the arts within the University.

The Frances Hodgkins Fellowship is named after the New Zealand painter Frances Hodgkins (1869–1947) who was born in Dunedin.

Frances Hodgkins Fellows
The artists who have received this award are as follows:
 1966 Michael Illingworth
 1967 Tanya Ashken
 1968 Derek Ball
 1969 Ralph Hotere
 1970 Michael Smither
 1971/1972 Marté Szirmay
 1973 Ray Thorburn
 1974 Marilynn Webb
 1975 John S. Parker
 1976 Ian Bergquist
 1977 Jeffrey Harris
 1978 Grahame Sydney
 1979 Matthew Pine
 1980 Andrew Drummond
 1981 Gretchen Albrecht
 1982 Chris Booth
 1983 Joanna Margaret Paul
 1984 Michael Armstrong
 1985 Dennis O'Connor
 1986 Ian C. McMillan
 1987 Kendal Heyes
 1988 Julia Morison
 1989 Shona Rapira Davies
 1990 Siegfried Koglmeier
 1991 Christine Webster
 1992 Neil Frazer
 1993 Peter Gibson Smith
 1994 Nicola Jackson
 1995 Jeffrey Thomson
 1996/1997 Fiona Pardington
 1998 Shane Cotton
 1999 Séraphine Pick
 2000 Jim Speers
 2001 Ava Seymour
 2002 Scott Eady
 2003 Sara Hughes
 2004 Mladen Buizumic
 2005 Rohan Wealleans
 2006 Sarah Munro
 2007 Ben Cauchi
 2008 Heather Straka
 2009 Eddie Clemens
 2010 Joanna Langford
 2011 Kushana Bush
 2012 Nick Austin
 2013 Zina Swanson
 2014 Patrick Lundberg
 2015 John Ward Knox
 2016 Miranda Parkes
 2017 Campbell Patterson
 2018 Louise Menzies
 2019 Imogen Taylor
 2020 & 2021 Bridget Reweti
 2022 Sorawit Songsataya

References

External links
 Frances Hodgkins Fellowship
 General outline of Burns, Hodgkins, and Mozart Fellowships

See also
Robert Burns Fellowship
Mozart Fellowship

New Zealand art awards
Awards and prizes of the University of Otago
1962 establishments in New Zealand